Xanthippe (minor planet designation: 156 Xanthippe) is a dark background asteroid from the central regions of the asteroid belt, approximately  in diameter. It was discovered on 22 November 1875, by Austrian astronomer Johann Palisa at the Austrian Naval Observatory, in what is now Croatia. It is named after Xanthippe, the wife of the Greek philosopher Socrates.

Orbit and classification 

Xanthippe is a non-family asteroid from the main belt's background population. It orbits the Sun in the central main-belt at a distance of 2.1–3.3 AU once every 4 years and 6 months (1,645 days; semi-major axis of 2.73 AU). Its orbit has an eccentricity of 0.23 and an inclination of 10° with respect to the ecliptic.

Physical characteristics 

Photometric observations of this asteroid at the European Southern Observatory in La Silla, Chile during 1981 gave a light curve with a period of 22.5 hours. Based upon its spectrum this is classified as a hydrated C-type asteroid (Ch-subtype) in the SMASS classification, indicating that it likely has a carbonaceous composition.

Diameter and albedo 

According to the surveys carried out by the Infrared Astronomical Satellite IRAS, the Japanese Akari satellite and the NEOWISE mission of NASA's Wide-field Infrared Survey Explorer, Xanthippe measures between 110.409 and 143.35 kilometers in diameter and its surface has an albedo between 0.030 and 0.0687.

Naming 

This minor planet was named for Xanthippe, the wife of the Greek philosopher Socrates (c. 470–399 BC), after whom asteroid 5450 Sokrates was named. The official naming citation was mentioned in The Names of the Minor Planets by Paul Herget in 1955.

References

External links 
 Asteroid Lightcurve Database (LCDB), query form (info )
 Dictionary of Minor Planet Names, Google books
 Asteroids and comets rotation curves, CdR – Observatoire de Genève, Raoul Behrend
 Discovery Circumstances: Numbered Minor Planets (1)-(5000) – Minor Planet Center
 
 

000156
Discoveries by Johann Palisa
Named minor planets
000156
000156
18751122